Karm is a 1977 Hindi film.

Karm may also refer to:
 Karma
 KARM, a radio of California
 Karm Island (Norway)
 Karm Island (Antarctica)
 Friedrich Karm (1907–1980), Estonian footballer

See also 
 Kram (disambiguation)